Listary is a desktop search utility for Windows that can search for files on a computer. It works with items in File Explorer, Task Manager, Registry Editor, Windows Desktop, and "Open..." or "Save..." dialog boxes. Listary is licensed free of charge for personal use.

Features 
 Smart Search: Find-as-you-type search list that narrows down on typing a part of item name.
 Wildcards: Find-as-you-type search using wildcards like '*' and '?'.
 Shortcut to command mode: type /cmd to enter command line window in the current directory.
 Hotkey: Press Super+W to start Listary. Customize shortcuts to select items from lists.
 Tool sits in system tray, showing only a search bar that disappears upon pressing Esc key.
 'Traditional' search: Find-as-you-type search list that narrows down on typing item name in exact order.
 Text editing with the preferred text editor.
 Auto-complete on pressing the Tab key.
 Regular expression support.

See also 
 Journaling file system
 USN Journal

References

External links

Reviews
 Supercharge Windows File Management with Listary Appstorm's Review
 Reviewing Listary, an Awesome File Browsing and Searching tool For Windows  GuidingTech's Review
 Listary CNET Editors' review
 Listary - Smart solution for browsing and finding files or folders FindMySoft Editor's Review
 Finding files in Windows folders: Listary
 A Great Improvement On The Windows File Dialog
 How To: Improve File Searching in Windows Explorer using Listary
 GIGA SOFTWARE Review

Desktop search engines